NonStopErotik is the sixteenth and final studio album by Black Francis released by Cooking Vinyl on March 30, 2010, in the US, and April 5 elsewhere.

The album was recorded in Brooklyn, Los Angeles, and a "haunted studio in London." Following the album's release, Black curtailed his solo career to commit to full time recording with Pixies in 2013.

Track listing
All tracks composed by Black Francis; except where indicated
 "Lake of Sin"– 4:28
 "O My Tidy Sum"– 3:47
 "Rabbits"– 2:00
 "Wheels" (Chris Hillman, Gram Parsons)– 2:38
 "Dead Man's Curve"– 2:56
 "Corrina"– 2:02
 "Six Legged Man"– 2:47
 "Wild Son"– 3:24
 "When I Go Down on You"– 3:39
 "Nonstoperotik"– 3:27
 "Cinema Star"– 5:41

Personnel 
Credits adapted from the album's liner notes.
The album sleeve features no individual credits for the musicians. 
Musicians
 Black Francis  
 Dave Phillips  
 Eric Drew Feldman  
 Todd O'Keefe  
 Tony Maimone 
 David Henderson  
 Todd Demma  
 Jack Kidney 
Technical
 Eric Drew Feldman – producer
 Black Francis – producer
 Wesley Siedman – engineer (at Ocean Way Studios)
 Howard 'Head' Bullivant – engineer (at RAK Studios)
 Jonathan Sterling – assistant engineer (at Ocean Way Studios)
 Robbie Nelson – assistant engineer (at RAK Studios)
 Helen Atkinson – assistant engineer (at RAK Studios)
 Tony Maimone – assistant engineer (at Studio G)
 John Dent – mastering
 Mark Lemhouse – design 
 Aaron Lucy – photography

References

2010 albums
Black Francis albums
Cooking Vinyl albums